Rabie Ridge is a township near Johannesburg, South Africa. It is located in Region A of the City of Johannesburg Metropolitan Municipality and is located east of Midrand (adjacent to Tembisa). It is a township formed due to forced removals of the coloured community from Alexandra and is named after Jack Rabie.

Rabie Ridge has a vast majority of people living there which speak different South African languages like Afrikaans, isiZulu, Sesotho and others.

References

Johannesburg Region A
Townships in Gauteng